Maria Martins may refer to:
 Maria Martins (athlete), French middle distance runner
 Maria Martins (artist), Brazilian visual artist
 Maria Martins (cyclist), Portuguese racing cyclist
 Maria de Lourdes Martins, Portuguese pianist and composer